KTIC-FM (107.9 FM) is a radio station broadcasting a country music format. Like its sister AM station KTIC it is licensed to West Point, Nebraska, United States. The station serves the Norfolk area, which is part of the Sioux City, Iowa market.  The station is currently owned by Nebraska Rural Radio Association and features programming from ABC Radio .

The station changed its call sign from the original KWPN on July 2, 2007.  KTIC-FM is a country music station, known commonly as "107.9 The Bull".

KTIC-FM has been owned and operated by the Nebraska Rural Radio Association as part of the KRVN network since 1997, when it was purchased from founders David and Sharon Kelley. There are daily market updates, as well as other agricultural news.  The station is an ABC affiliate, and features regular news programming from ABC.

References

External links

TIC-FM
Country radio stations in the United States